() is a private railway operator in Tokyo, Japan, and the central firm of the  that is involved in transport, retail, real estate and other industries.

The Keio railway network connects the western suburbs of Tokyo (Chōfu, Fuchū, Hachiōji, Hino, Inagi, Tama) and Sagamihara in Kanagawa with central Tokyo at Shinjuku Station.

Lines

The Keio network is based around the central Keiō Line, 32 stations.

The Keio Inokashira Line does not share track with the Main Line. It intersects with the Keio Line at Meidaimae Station.

History
The company's earliest predecessor was the  founded in 1905. It began operating its first stretch of interurban between Sasazuka and Chōfu in 1913. By 1923, Keiō had completed its main railway line (now the Keiō Line) between Shinjuku and Hachiōji.

The Inokashira Line began operating in 1933 as a completely separate company, . This company had also planned to link  with Suzaki (now Kōtō ward), though this never materialized. In 1940, Teito merged with the Odakyu Electric Railway, and in 1942 the combined companies were merged by government order into  (now Tokyu Corporation).

In 1947, the shareholders of Tokyu voted to spin off the Keio and Inokashira lines into a new company, . The company's English name was changed to Keio Corporation on June 29, 2005.

Priority seats 

Keiō was among the first railway companies to introduce priority seats on its trains. Priority seats are those reserved for the physically handicapped, elderly, pregnant women, and people with infants. These special seats, which were initially called "Silver seats" but renamed in 1993, were inaugurated on Respect for the Aged Day on September 15, 1973.

Rolling stock
All Keio trains have longitudinal (commuter-style) seating.

gauge lines
 7000 series (since 1984)
 8000 series (since 1992)
 9000 series (since 2001)
 5000 series (2nd generation) (since 2017)

The first of a fleet of five new ten-car 5000 series EMUs was introduced on 29 September 2017, ahead of the start of new evening reserved-seat commuter services from Shinjuku in spring 2018.

gauge lines
1000 series (2nd generation) (since 1996)

Former rolling stock

gauge lines
5000 series (from 1963 until 1996)
6000 series (from 1972 until 2011)

gauge lines
1000 series (from 1957 until 1984)
3000 series (from 1962 until 2011)

Related companies

Transport
Mitake Tozan Railway
Keio Dentetsu Bus
Nishi Tokyo Bus

Retail
Keio Department Store
Keio Store

Other
 Keio Realty and Development
 Keio Travel Agency
 Keio Plaza Hotel
 Keio Construction

References

External links

 

 
Transport companies based in Tokyo
Western Tokyo